KBGN (1060 AM) is a radio station broadcasting a Christian radio format. Licensed to Caldwell, Idaho, United States, the station serves the Boise area.  The station is currently owned by Nelson M. and Karen E. Wilson.

References

External links

FCC History Cards for KBGN

BGN
Radio stations established in 1965
Caldwell, Idaho
1965 establishments in Idaho
BGN